Benjamin Dyball (born 20 April 1989 in Blacktown) is an Australian cyclist, who currently rides for UCI Continental team . In October 2020, he was named in the startlist for the 2020 Vuelta a España.

Major results

2009
 9th Time trial, Oceania Under-23 Road Championships
2011
 1st  Road race, National Under-23 Road Championships
 10th Gran Premio Palio del Recioto
2013
 Oceania Road Championships
2nd  Time trial
6th Road race
 2nd Overall New Zealand Cycle Classic
 5th Overall Tour of Japan
1st Stage 4
2014
 2nd Overall Tour of Tasmania
1st Stage 1
 Oceania Road Championships
4th Time trial
10th Road race
 10th Overall New Zealand Cycle Classic
2015
 8th Time trial, Oceania Road Championships
2016
 1st  Overall Tour of Tasmania
1st Stage 3
 3rd  Time trial, Oceania Road Championships
 3rd Taiwan KOM Challenge
2017
 2nd  Time trial, Oceania Road Championships
 3rd Time trial, National Road Championships
 10th Overall Tour du Jura
2018
 1st  Overall Tour of Thailand
1st Mountains classification
1st Stage 3
 1st  Overall Tour de Ijen
1st Mountains classification
1st Stage 4
 2nd Overall Tour de Kumano
 2nd Overall Tour of Taihu Lake
 2nd Overall Tour of Fuzhou
 2nd Taiwan KOM Challenge
 3rd Overall Tour de Langkawi
 3rd Overall Tour de Siak
1st Stage 2
 8th Overall Tour de Indonesia
2019
 Oceania Road Championships
1st  Road race
1st  Time trial
 1st  Overall Tour de Langkawi
1st Stage 4
 1st Stage 5 Tour de Indonesia
 1st Peaks Challenge Falls Creek
 2nd Taiwan KOM Challenge
 3rd Overall Tour of Qinghai Lake
1st Stage 7 (ITT)
 3rd Overall Tour de Tochigi
1st Stage 1 (ITT)
 7th Overall Tour de Iskandar Johor
 8th Overall Tour de Ijen
2022
 1st  Overall Tour de Taiwan
1st Stage 2
 2nd Overall Tour of Japan
1st Stage 2
 3rd Japan Cup
 8th Overall Tour de Kumano

Grand Tour general classification results timeline

References

External links

1989 births
Living people
Australian male cyclists
Cyclists from Sydney